This page contains a chronological summary of major events from the 1960 Summer Olympics in Rome.

Calendar

Day 1: Thu 25 August
No medal events

Day 2: Fri 26 August

Day 3: Sat 27 August

Day 4: Sun 28 August
No events

Day 5: Mon 29 August

Day 6: Tue 30 August

Day 7: Wed 31 August

Day 8: Thu 1 September

Day 9: Fri 2 September

Day 10: Sat 3 September

Day 11: Sun 4 September
No events

Day 12: Mon 5 September

Day 13: Tue 6 September

Day 14: Wed 7 September

Day 15: Thu 8 September

Day 16: Fri 9 September

Day 17: Sat 10 September

Day 18: Sun 11 September

References

Highlights
1960